Sławoszów  is a village located in Poland, in the Opole Voivodeship, Głubczyce County, Gmina Głubczyce, near the border with the Czech Republic.

References

Villages in Głubczyce County